The Regent String Quartet are a British string quartet,

The Regent String Quartet was formed in the mid-1990s. Their original lineup was Helen Godbolt, Sarah Turner, Caryn Cohen and Emma Martin (see the Members section for more details).

They were formed at the Royal Academy of Music where they were all trained as classical players.

There is also an Australian string quartet of the same name based in Melbourne, Victoria.

Members

Current lineup 
 Caryn Cohen (First Violin)
 Emma Martin (Second Violin)
 Sarah Turner (Viola)
 Helen Godbolt (Cello)

Appearances

Artists whom they have supported
KanYe West, McFly, Vanessa Mae, Gabrielle, Mostly Autumn, Nigel Kennedy, Julian Lloyd Webber,
Luciano Pavarotti, Russell Watson, The Opera Babes.

TV
Too Good To Be True (ITV, 2003),
Comic Relief 2005, supporting McFly,
Brit Awards (several years) - accompanying strings,
Top Of The Pops (several appearances) - accompanying strings.

Film
The Lord of the Rings soundtrack

DVD
 The V Shows (DVD 2004, CD 2005)

External links
The official Regent Quartet homepage
Alive Network profile of the quartet
BC Review of The V Shows DVD

The Australian Regent String Quartet webpage

English string quartets
Musical groups established in 1996